Morten Drægni (born 19 August 1983) is a former politician for the Socialist Left Party.

He served as a deputy representative to the Parliament of Norway from Oslo during the terms 2005–2009 and 2009–2013. In total he met during 14 days of parliamentary session.

References

1983 births
Living people
Norwegian police officers
Socialist Left Party (Norway) politicians
Deputy members of the Storting
Politicians from Oslo
Place of birth missing (living people)
21st-century Norwegian politicians